The Flats is a 2002 independent film written and directed by brothers Tyler Requa and Kelly Requa.  Filmed near Mt. Vernon and the Skagit Valley of Washington, The Flats was produced by Clear Pictures, LLC  and premiered at the 2002 Seattle International Film Festival.

Plot summary
The Flats tells a cautionary tale of friendship and desire played out among a group of 20-somethings transitioning into adulthood.  Main character Harper and his buddies make the most of their freedom prior to an impending court-ordered jail sentence.  Things get even more serious when Harper and his best friend's girlfriend, Paige, begin a sobering relationship.

Featured cast
 Chad Lindberg as Harper 
 Sean Christensen as Luke 
 Jude Herrera as Paige
 Cristen Coppen as Kate
 Lindsay Beamish as Jennifer 
 Greg Fawcett as Chaz
 Danny Pickering as Mark 
 Swil Kanim as Jesse
 Luc Reynaud as Tully 
 Paul West Jr. as Luke's Father
 Rabecca Rosencrans as Luke's Mother

Awards
DC INDEPENDENT FILM FESTIVAL - Grand Jury Special Mention
KINDRED INTERNATIONAL FILM FESTIVAL - Winner, Best Actor (Chad Lindberg)
NEW YORK INTERNATIONAL INDEPENDENT FILM FESTIVAL - Winner, Best Score (Sean Christensen), Best Actress (Jude Herrera)
SEATTLE INTERNATIONAL FILM FESTIVAL - https://variety.com/2002/film/reviews/the-flats-1200547439/

External links
 The Flats at IMDB
 The Flats at Rotten Tomatoes

2002 films
American comedy-drama films
2002 comedy-drama films
2000s English-language films
2000s American films